is a Japanese actor. He appeared in more than 40 films since 2004.

Selected filmography

Film

Television

External links 

1977 births
Living people
Japanese male film actors
People from Gifu Prefecture
Male actors from Gifu Prefecture